Adolph W. Ewert was a politician in the state of South Dakota.

Biography
Ewert was born on June 18, 1865, to Edward and Mina Ewert in La Crosse County, Wisconsin. On September 30, 1890, he married Carrie E. Dutcher. He was Baptist.

Career
Ewert was a delegate to the 1908 Republican National Convention. Later he served as a member of the South Dakota State Senate. From 1913 to 1917, Ewert was the Treasurer of South Dakota.

References

People from La Crosse County, Wisconsin
Republican Party South Dakota state senators
1865 births
20th-century deaths
State treasurers of South Dakota